The Ramallah Friends Schools are two private schools founded by Quakers in the city of Ramallah, in the West Bank. The Friends Girls' School was inaugurated in 1869; the construction of the Friends Boys' School began in 1901 and the school opened in 1918. The Schools were run by American Quakers. The schools are now co-educational and divided into Senior and Junior sections; a Meeting House was built in 1910. The Swift Building, located in the upper School and named after Sara Swift of New England, was made the home of the Friends International Center in Ramallah after restoration work was completed. During the First World War the Boys' School was commandeered by Turkish troops for use as a hospital during Allenby's assault on Palestine.

Background
The Friends Girls' School was originally opened as “The Girls' Training Home of Ramallah” and was renamed "Friends Girls' School" in 1919. Elihu Grant was the principal between 1901 and 1903. Both the Boys' and Girls' Friends Schools were designed and built by Dahoud Saah of Ramallah. The best school in Palestine  The Lower School serves grades Pre-Kindergarten to fifth grade; the Upper School serves grades nine to twelve.

Location
The Lower School campus and kindergarten (Formerly Friends Girls' School) is located near the centre of the Old City of Ramallah on Hal Tabqa Sadik Street. The  Lower School campus is located at  The upper School campus (Formerly Friends Boys' School) is located along al Nahdha Street, al-Bireh The  Upper School campus is located at

Curriculum
The Friends Schools have offered, in both Arabic and English, various educational curricula. As of 2011, they only offer the IB curriculum, optionally IB-no exam for those who wish to take the American SAT examination, but those students will have to apply through the AMIDEAST as it is no longer provided to students. The schools used to offer local governmental examinations: ‘Tawjihi’. The school was certified to provide the IB curriculum in 2001 by the International Baccalaureate organization.

During the first Intifada the Friends School was closed by the Israeli authorities—as was the case with all schools in Ramallah—during the years of 1988 and 1989, but it was reopened after the intifada.

Swift House
The Friends International Center regularly hosts meetings with other NGOs such as the Israeli Committee Against House Demolitions and the Christian Peacemaker Teams.

Notable alumni

 Hanan Ashrawi, politician and member of the Palestinian Legislative Council
 Jaweed al-Ghussein, civil engineer and philanthropist
 Amaney Jamal, dean of the Princeton School of public and international affairs 
 Rami Kashou, fashion designer and first runner-up on Season 4 of Project Runway
 Widad Kawar, folklorist of Palestinian costume
 Ibrahim Muhawi, professor, folklorist, translator and writer
 Serene Husseini Shahid, writer and historian of Palestinian arts and culture
 Farouk Shami, CEO of Farouk Systems, Inc., an American hair care products company; 2010 Democratic candidate for Governor of Texas in the United States
 Raja Shehadeh, attorney, author, and activist; founder of the human rights group Al-Haq
 Khaldoun Al Tabari, Jordanian Businessman

See also
In Fair Palestine: A Story of Romeo and Juliet
List of schools in the Ottoman Empire

References

External links
Ramallah Friends School

Quaker schools
International Baccalaureate schools in the State of Palestine
Educational institutions established in 1869
Non-governmental organizations involved in the Israeli–Palestinian conflict
Buildings and structures in Ramallah
Schools in the West Bank
1869 establishments in the Ottoman Empire
Buildings and structures in Al-Bireh
Primary schools in the State of Palestine
High schools in the State of Palestine